Marin May (born September 9, 1977, U.S.) is an American actress who has starred in movies and on television.

Her best known role is in the 1983 NBC miniseries V as Katie Maxwell. She reprised her role in the 1984 sequel V: The Final Battle.

Her movie roles include High School High (1996) and the TV movie Sorority (1999).

Marin made guest appearances in the TV series Alien Nation and Party of Five.

External links

American film actresses
American television actresses
1977 births
Living people
21st-century American women